Pyotr Alekseevich Bogdanov (Russian: Пётр Алексеевич Богданов; 1 June 1882 – 12 May 1939) was a Soviet statesman, engineer and economist who was chairman of the Supreme Council of the National Economy of the Russian SFSR.

Biography

Early life and career 
Born in the family of a Moscow merchant of the second guild. He graduated from the Alexander Commercial School and the Imperial Moscow Technical School. He was rejected to work at the school because of political unreliability.

Bogdanov took an active part in the student movement. From 1901 he was a member of the executive committee of student communities, was the treasurer of the student fund, kept a hectograph at home, on which revolutionary proclamations were printed. In 1902 he was arrested and sentenced to six months in prison. Returning to the school, he continued his revolutionary activities. In July 1905 he joined the Bolshevik faction Russian Social Democratic Labor Party (RSDLP(b)). In 1905 he participated in the illegal All-Russian Congress of Student Organizations in Finland.

In the autumn of 1905 he was called up for military service, which he held the rank of conductor (non-commissioned officer) in the Voronezh engineering distance (military unit on railway transport). At the same time, he continued revolutionary work, was a member of the Voronezh Committee of the RSDLP, headed its military organization. From 1906 to 1908 he worked in the Moscow military organization, was a member of the Moscow Party Committee, led the Social Democratic student organizations in Moscow.

From 1910 he was head of the Moscow city gas network. During this period, he continued to participate in the activities of the RSDLP, in February–March 1911 he was under arrest.

With the outbreak of the First World War, at the end of 1914 he was drafted into the army. He briefly served as an interpreter in a Moscow military hospital for prisoners of war and was later sent to the front for a short period of time. He was recalled to Moscow and was involved in the reconstruction of bridges.

After the revolution 
After the February Revolution of 1917, he resumed active political activity. He was elected chairman of the military section of the Gomel Soviet, a member of the presidium of the executive committee of the council, chairman of the city duma and chairman of the Revolutionary Guard Committee. During the speech of General Kornilov in August 1917, he organized the blocking of communications between the Headquarters in Mogilev and the Don, as a result of which Kornilov's supporters were arrested. He supported the coming to power of the Bolsheviks, in November 1917 he became chairman of the Gomel Revolutionary Committee. After the dissolution of the city duma and the revolutionary committee, he worked in the Gomel trade unions. In the spring of 1918 he was exiled by the German occupation forces to the territory of the RSFSR.

As head of the economy 
From 1918, authorized by the Supreme Economic Council for the nationalization of the chemical industry of the Urals and the North. In 1919-1925 he headed the council (Main Directorate) of the military industry of the Supreme Economic Council. During the civil war, he introduced the principle of planned production cooperation between military factories, which led to the production of the first Soviet-made tank in 1920 in Sormov. He was also a member of the Main Concession Committee and dealt with foreign firms. Bogdanov was fluent in English, German and French.

From 1921 to 1923 he was chairman of the Supreme Economic Council of the RSFSR. He oversaw the first major Soviet construction projects - the construction of the Kashirskaya and Volkhovskaya power plants. He was one of the active promoters of the New Economic Policy (NEP). He encouraged the creation of trusts as state associations of enterprises enjoying wide economic autonomy, operating freely on the market and making optimal use of all factors of production. He defended the trust form of organization of production from the supporters of "Glavkism".

In the North Caucasus and United States 
From 1926 to 1929 he was Chairman of the North Caucasian Regional Executive Committee. He achieved the allocation in 1927 of appropriations for the start of work on the construction of the Volga-Don canal, which were immediately started after that. He was one of the initiators of the construction of the Rostselmash plant.

He was a member of the Central Auditing Commission of the All-Union Communist Party from 1927 to 1930.

From 1930 to 1934 Bogdanov headed the Amtorg joint-stock company. He established contacts with the US business community and as engaged in lecture activities and American economic management. Bogdanov's activities contributed to the establishment of diplomatic relations between the Soviet and the United States in 1933.

Later life and death 
From 1935 to 1937 he was First Deputy People's Commissar of Local Industry of the RSFSR. He continued to publish articles on economic issues. In one of his articles in Pravda, analyzing the American experience, he wrote:In order to quickly create your own technical culture… it is necessary to constantly study what is happening abroad… It is not so important to know the latest secrets, but it is important to learn the very direction of work and the methodology by which development is carried out. Up to now we in America have paid our main attention to heavy industry. But now we are faced with the task of saturating the market with consumer goods, everyday items.In 1937, he was accused of keeping a store of arms removed from work and expelled from the party.

On November 22, 1937, Bogdanov was arrested and was interrogated. On March 15, 1938, he was sentenced to death by the Military Collegium of the Supreme Court of the USSR. The sentence was carried out on May 12, 1939. He was buried at the Kommunarka shooting ground.

In March 1956 he was rehabilitated. A monument to Pyotr Bogdanov was erected at the Novodevichy cemetery on the grave of his wife Alexandra Klementyevna.

References 

1882 births
1939 deaths
Economists from Moscow
Soviet engineers
Soviet economists
Russian revolutionaries
Old Bolsheviks
Russian Social Democratic Labour Party members
20th-century Russian engineers
Great Purge victims from Russia
Soviet rehabilitations
People of the Russian Civil War